DingIt is a video games and eSports video-hosting website headquartered in London, England.

History 
Founded in 2014 by Mark Hain, DingIt put on a variety of original live e-Sports events and launched at the end of February 2015 with 7,000 viewers and grew to over 170,000 viewers by the end of April 2015. The company has received two rounds of funding to date, the first consisting of $1.5M follow-on seed funding.

In 2016, DingIt changed their content to focus on short-form highlights, instead of long format tournament videos.

At the start of 2017, DingIt's parent company was renamed to Level Up Media in order to grow a portfolio of owned and operated sites and syndication partner network within gaming. DingIt continues as the flagship site in the Level Up Media network.

Partner Program 
On 09/29/2016 DingIt became the official video partner of professional eSports team Splyce.

References

External links 
 

Entertainment companies of the United Kingdom
Entertainment companies established in 2014
Internet properties established in 2014
Internet television channels
Mass media companies established in 2014
Software companies based in London
Software companies established in 2014
Video game websites
Video hosting